Sayyid Hassan Aghaee Firouzabadi (3 February 1951 – 3 September 2021) was an Iranian military officer. He served as the Chief-of-Staff of the Iranian Armed Forces—the most senior military authority in Iran—from 1989 to 2016. After that, he was appointed as a senior military advisor to the Supreme Leader of Iran and a member of the Expediency Discernment Council.

Early life
Firouzabadi was born on 3 February 1951 in the town of Malabad, in Mashhad, Iran, to religious parents who came from Yazd. He studied at the Ferdowsi University of Mashhad, graduating in 1980, one year after the Iranian Revolution. He then took a part in the Iran–Iraq War and rose in prominence. He was in charge of the industrial war engineering, and the committee for the construction of surface-to-surface missiles. After the end of the war on 25 October 1989, Ali Khamenei appointed him head of the General Staff.

Military career
Before he was appointed the chief-of-staff, Firouzabadi had no previous military experience from either the Islamic Revolutionary Guard Corps (IRGC), or the Islamic Republic of Iran Army (Artesh), and he went by the title Basiji. On 17 April 1995, Supreme Leader Ali Khamenei granted him the rank of major general, practically the highest military rank available in Iran. According to a report published by The Washington Institute for Near East Policy, he was credited with "leading the IRGC from a war-ravaged organization to a hybrid conventional-asymmetric military force overshadowing the still-lagging Artesh. He also oversaw a growing military industry that produced a wide range of products amid international sanctions, from ammunition to space rockets".

Controversy 
Following the death of Kavous Seyed-Emami in custody in 2018, Firouzabadi claimed that “Several years ago, some individuals came to Iran... In their possessions were a variety of reptile desert species like lizards, chameleons... We found out that their skin attracts atomic waves and that they were nuclear spies who wanted to find out where do we (inside the Islamic Republic of Iran) have uranium mines, and where are we engaged in atomic activities”. Several scientists dismissed his remarks as absurd.

In October 2011, he was banned from entering the European Union for alleged violation of human rights.

Political positions
Firouzabadi expressed anti-American sentiment, rejecting a letter sent to him by the US Congress and said that "the scourge of Americans were a threat to the Revolution."

Firouzabadi was a supporter of former president Mahmoud Ahmadinejad's ideology and called on the Higher National Defense University to add to his ideology. Defending the continuation of Ahmadinejad's presidency, he also said in a speech that provoked criticism from most of the presidential candidates:
"Now some believe that the distance that groups of politicians have created between the government and the people has been successful and has been able to attract the attention of the people. Therefore, in this presidential election, they can nominate a new presidential candidate and end the issue of Ahmadinejad. But this does not happen, they make mistakes". He further criticized former president Mohammad Khatami. However, towards the end of Ahmadinejad's presidency, he became critical of Ahmadinejad's positions.

Death 
According to media reports on 3 September 2021, Firouzabadi died at the age of 70 from COVID-19, amid the COVID-19 pandemic in Iran. A funeral attended by senior military commanders was held in Tehran on Saturday 4 September.

See also 
 List of Iranian two-star generals since 1979

References

External links
 

Iranian major generals
1951 births
2021 deaths
People from Mashhad
Chiefs of Staff of the Iranian Armed Forces
Iranian individuals subject to the U.S. Department of the Treasury sanctions
Deaths from the COVID-19 pandemic in Iran
Anti-Americanism